Great Britain competed at the 2008 European Track Championships in Pruszków, Poland, from 3 September to 7 September 2008. Great Britain competed in 31 of the 34 events.

List of medalists

Results

Under-23

Sprint

Source

Time trial

Individual Pursuit

Team pursuit

Team sprint

Keirin

Scratch

Points race

Junior

Sprint

Source

Time trial

Individual Pursuit

Team Pursuit

Team Sprint

Keirin

Scratch

Points race

Madison

See also

  Belarus at the 2008 UEC European Track Championships
  Lithuania at the 2008 UEC European Track Championships
  Netherlands at the 2008 UEC European Track Championships

References

2008 in British sport
Great Britain at cycling events
Nations at the 2008 UEC European Track Championships